Kyle James McAlarney (born July 7, 1987) is an American high school basketball coach. He played nine professional seasons, last for Orléans Loiret Basket of LNB Pro B. He played college basketball for Notre Dame.

At the close of the 2017–18 season, McAlarney retired from playing to become head coach at his alma mater, Moore Catholic High School in Staten Island, New York.

McAlarney was inducted into the Staten Island Sports Hall of Fame in 2012.

See also

References

External links
Notre Dame Fighting Irish bio

1987 births
Living people
American expatriate basketball people in France
American expatriate basketball people in Greece
American men's basketball players
Basketball players from New York City
Fort Wayne Mad Ants players
High school basketball coaches in the United States
Limoges CSP players
Notre Dame Fighting Irish men's basketball players
Orléans Loiret Basket players
Point guards
Shooting guards
Sportspeople from Staten Island
Springfield Armor players